Venezuela  has been participating at the  Deaflympics since 1969 and  has earned a total of 37 medals.

Venezuela yet to compete at the Winter Deaflympic Games.

Medal tallies

References

External links
Deaflympics official website
2017 Deaflympics

Nations at the Deaflympics
Parasports in Venezuela
Deaf culture in Venezuela